Urbano Monti (16 August 1544 – 15 May 1613) (alternate spelling: Urbano Monte) was an Italian cartographer.

Life 

He was born and raised in Milan, Italy.

Career  

His most famous work is the Planisphere.

Some of his best known works are a part of the David Rumsey Map Collection of Stanford University and have been recently digitized.

Bibliography 

His notable books include:

 Descrizione del mondo sin qui conosciuto

 Un prezioso cimelio della cartografia italiana

References

External links 

 
 

16th-century Italian cartographers
1544 births
1613 deaths
Scientists from Milan
17th-century Italian cartographers